Richard Elliott Fehr (born August 28, 1962) is an American professional golfer who has played on the PGA Tour and the Nationwide Tour.

Fehr was born in Seattle, Washington and grew up in the state of Washington. As a teenager, Fehr won the Washington State Junior and PGA National Junior tournaments in 1979. He attended Brigham Young University in Provo, Utah and was a member of the golf team. He was a two-time All-American while at BYU and won numerous amateur tournaments, including the 1982 Western Amateur. He was the low amateur at both The Masters and the U.S. Open in 1984. Fehr turned pro in 1984 after earning his degree in finance; he joined the PGA Tour in 1985.

Fehr won two PGA Tour events: the 1986 B.C. Open and the 1994 Walt Disney World/Oldsmobile Classic. He finished runner-up in a PGA Tour event (2nd or T-2) nine times and had 41 top-10 finishes. His best finish in a major championship was a T-9 at the 1985 U.S. Open.

Fehr now earns his living as Director of Instruction at Aldarra Golf Club.

Amateur wins
1981 Pacific Northwest Amateur
1982 Western Amateur

Professional wins (3)

PGA Tour wins (2)

PGA Tour playoff record (0–4)

Other wins (1)
1994 Northwest Open

Results in major championships

Note: Fehr never played in The Open Championship.

LA = low amateur
CUT = missed the half-way cut
"T" = tied

Summary

Most consecutive cuts made – 5 (1984 Masters – 1986 U.S. Open)
Longest streak of top-10s – 1

Team appearances
Amateur
Walker Cup: 1983 (winners)

See also
1985 PGA Tour Qualifying School graduates
1989 PGA Tour Qualifying School graduates
1998 PGA Tour Qualifying School graduates
1999 PGA Tour Qualifying School graduates

References

External links

American male golfers
BYU Cougars men's golfers
PGA Tour golfers
Golfers from Seattle
1962 births
Living people